Keith Shannon (born 17 September 1966) is a British diplomat. He served as British Ambassador to Latvia from 2017 to 2021 and British Ambassador to Moldova from 2009 to 2013.

Early life
He is the son of Andrew Shannon and Catherine Sutherland, and was born in Edinburgh.

He attended Craigmount High School, a comprehensive school in Edinburgh. He gained an MA in Modern History with International Relations from the University of St Andrews.

Career
He joined HM Diplomatic Service in 1988. From 1995-99 he was the Second Secretary (Technology) in Paris.

On 18 May 2009 Shannon became the Ambassador to Moldova in Chişinău. His appointment was announced on 20 November 2008. He kissed hands with the Queen on 19 February 2009. He was replaced in Moldova by Philip Batson in April 2013 and it was announced he would transfer to another Diplomatic Service appointment.

Shannon succeeded Sarah Cowley as the Ambassador to Latvia in June 2017. He was succeeded by Paul Brummell in July 2021.

References

External links

UK in Moldova on Flickr
SHANNON, Keith, Who's Who 2013, A & C Black, 2013; online edn, Oxford University Press, Dec 2012, accessed 9 April 2013 
Keith Shannon jokes at Moldovan Football Annual Event, youtube.com, December 2011

 

1966 births
Living people
Diplomats from Edinburgh
People educated at Craigmount High School
Alumni of the University of St Andrews
Scottish diplomats
Ambassadors of the United Kingdom to Moldova
Ambassadors of the United Kingdom to Latvia